A list of horror films released in 1986.

References

Sources

 
  
 
 

 

Lists of horror films by year
Horror